Dale Ferguson may refer to:

 Dale Ferguson (rugby league) (born 1988), English rugby league footballer
 Dale Ferguson (designer), Australian theatrical scenic and costume designer